Dylan Mulvaney (born December 29, 1996) is an American actress and transgender rights activist known for detailing her gender transition in daily videos on the social media platform TikTok.  she has over 10 million followers on TikTok, while her video series, Days of Girlhood, has received over one billion views.

Early life and education 
Dylan Mulvaney was born on December 29, 1996, in San Diego, California, United States. She graduated from the University of Cincinnati's College-Conservatory of Music in 2019 with a Bachelor of Fine Arts in musical theater.

Career

2015–2020: Early acting roles 
Mulvaney's first significant role was playing the character Elder White in the musical The Book of Mormon following her graduation from college. Other roles included How The Grinch Stole Christmas! at the Old Globe Theatre; 8: The Play at the Birch North Park Theatre; Next to Normal at Arts Off Broadway; Legally Blonde; Spring Awakening; Bye Bye Birdie; and High School Musical at ACT San Diego.

2021–present: Transition and activism 
Mulvaney came out as a trans woman during the COVID-19 pandemic, while living with her "very conservative family" at her childhood home in San Diego. Starting in March 2022, she has documented her gender transition in a daily series of videos published on TikTok titled "Days of Girlhood". She said in an interview: "When the pandemic hit, I was doing the Broadway musical Book of Mormon. I found myself jobless and without the creative means to do what I loved. I downloaded TikTok, assuming it was a kids' app. Once I came out as a woman, I made this "day one of being a girl" comedic video. And it blew up. I really don't know another place online like TikTok that can make a creator grow at the rate that it does. Some of these other apps really celebrate perfection and over-editing and flawlessness. I think with TikTok specifically, people love the rawness. They love people just talking to the camera. I try to approach every video like a FaceTime with a friend."

In October 2022, Mulvaney appeared with genderfluid hairstylist David Lopez in a podcast for the cosmetics brand Ulta Beauty, during which she spoke about her childhood, her coming out as transgender, and her transition. According to Forbes staff writer Marisa Dellatto, the video led to the appearance of the hashtag #BoycottUlta in Twitter's "Trending Topics" section and resulted in "some calling Mulvaney’s claims she can live happily as a woman 'misogynistic' and others misgendering her."

Later that October, Mulvaney met with president Joe Biden for a "presidential forum" for the online news organization NowThis News. When asked by Mulvaney about recent legislation restricting gender-affirming care for transgender youth by Republican-led legislatures, Biden described them as "outrageous" and "immoral". NBC News reported that, following her meeting with Biden, Mulvaney became the target of a "vitriol campaign" by "right-wing activists". Republican Senator Marsha Blackburn shared a tweet in which she attached a TikTok video created by Mulvaney and said that "Dylan Mulvaney, Joe Biden, and radical left-wing lunatics want to make this absurdity normal". Media personality Caitlyn Jenner, who is also a transgender woman, wrote on Twitter that she agreed with Blackburn's remarks and called Mulvaney's video an "absurdity". Several days later, Mulvaney posted a video to TikTok in which she responded to Jenner's comments and explained how she was prompted to respond because Jenner had misgendered her: "Not you [Jenner] calling me a he! That is just ... terrible. But then you didn't stop there."

In December 2022, Mulvaney confirmed on Instagram that she had undertaken facial feminization surgery. She posted an image of her face on Instagram on January 27, and made her debut on the red carpet at the 65th Annual Grammy Awards on February 5, 2023. In late February, she accepted a Queerties Groundbreaker Award in Hollywood.

Mulvaney hosted a livestreamed variety show at the Rainbow Room in New York City on March 13, 2023, one year after starting her TikTok video series Days of Girlhood, with L Morgan Lee and Reneé Rapp guest starring.

Notes

References

External links 

1996 births
Living people
Activists from California
American LGBT actors
American TikTokers
LGBT TikTokers
People from San Diego
Transgender rights activists
Transgender women
University of Cincinnati – College-Conservatory of Music alumni